The Asa Line may refer to:
 Asa Kaigan Railway Asatō Line, a railway line connecting Tokushima Prefecture and Kōchi Prefecture, Japan
 Tosa Kuroshio Railway Asa Line, a railway line in Kōchi Prefecture, Japan

See also
 Asa Line (railway project), an incomplete railway project that includes both of the lines above listed